Michael Camerini is a British-born American film director, producer and cinematographer. His  filmmaking credits include FRONTLINE: Immigration Battle, Niger:Tales of Resilience, Twelve Stories: How Democracy Works Now, Well-Founded Fear, These Girls Are Missing, Becoming the Buddha in L.A., Dadi's Family and Born Again: Life in a Fundamentalist Baptist Church. His films have been featured on HBO, CNN, PBS, Human Rights Watch International Film Festival in London and New York City and The Sundance Film Festival among others.

Camerini aims for a filmmaking style that is non intrusive and that encourages people to tell their own stories. Camerini currently lives in New York City where he and his filmmaking partner, Shari Robertson, have a production company, The Epidavros Project, Inc.

Filmography

See also 

Shari Robertson
How Democracy Works Now
Well-Founded Fear

References

External links 

 
 Michael Camerini at Epidavros
 How Democracy Works Now Bio
 Director's Statement for How Democracy Works Now
 About Michael at nytimes.com

British documentary film directors
Place of birth missing (living people)
Year of birth missing (living people)
British documentary film producers
Living people